General elections were held in Liberia in 1923. In the presidential election, the result was a victory for Charles D. B. King of the True Whig Party, who was re-elected for a second term.

The results of the election were rigged, with King receiving 45,000 votes, despite there being only 6,000 Liberians eligible to vote.

References

Liberia
1923 in Liberia
Elections in Liberia
Election and referendum articles with incomplete results